La Passione is a British 1996 drama film written and produced by Chris Rea, directed by John B. Hobbs, and starring Sean Gallagher, Paul Shane and Shirley Bassey. The film premiered on 14 November 1996 at the BFI London Film Festival. The film features a cameo appearance by Rea, as well the same-titled soundtrack also composed by him. It reached #43 position in UK album charts, and was certified Silver by BPI in 1997.

Film
The film was released in five UK cities cinema from 16 May 1997. It is a tale of 10-year-old northern boy, the son of an Italian immigrant ice-cream making family, who develops a lifelong obsession with motor racing and especially with the real-life racer Wolfgang Von Trips, who was killed in his sharknose Ferrari 156 at the Monza Grand Prix in 1961. The film is partially inspired by Rea's childhood experience. Rea commented how "everyone's got a Von Trips in their life ... for some people it happened through football or movies - a day when a boy's empty, innocent mind suddenly has all kinds of new stuff blown into it".

Rea initially wanted to direct his own screenplay but Warner Vision, the film's distributors, did not let him and appointed John B Hobbs, a retired television director. The studio executives kept trying to turn his simple tale of childhood fantasy into something else, with which he felt disappointed. Rea commented that "there was a lot of hard work in making La Passione, and a lot of grief, because I had very set ideas about how I wanted it to be, and everyone else had a different idea ... I wanted none of it. My thing was about how fantasies occur, about passions, enjoying them." In a 2016 interview he recalls that Billy Connolly and Peter Capaldi were in advanced talks to star, but his original idea and script were changed. The primary idea was to be Warner Bros' first music DVD, "something to watch whilst you're listening to music". However, although they liked the idea and started to work on it, Rea lost complete control over it and under corporate pressure many people started to show up, with those especially from the USA not understanding the idea as it started to turn into, as Rea felt, a "boring film".

Soundtrack

On the film soundtrack, Shirley Bassey provides vocals on two tracks. (La Passione and a duet with Chris Rea Shirley Do You Own A Ferrari).The song La Passione was a big hit for Dame Shirley Bassey. The soundtrack was redone in recent years with new music, and was re-released in November 2015 in a deluxe package which consists of two CDs, consisting of remastered and remixed original and new tracks, and two DVDs, first consisting of re-edited original and new short films to accompany the music along with an interview with Rea, while second of a documentary about Wolfgang Von Trips, enclosed within a 72-page book.

Track listing
All songs by Chris Rea.
 "La Passione" (Film Theme) - 4:55
 "Dov'è II Signore?" - 6:04 (Vocals: Toby Draper) Recorded at The Mill Studios Cookham 23/11/93
 "Shirley Do You Own a Ferrari?" (Vocals: Chris Rea/Shirley Bassey) - 4:43
 "Girl in a Sports Car" - 5:16
 "When the Grey Skies Turn to Blue" - 3:43
 "Horses" - 3:05
 "Olive Oil" - 4:26
 "Only to Fly" - 5:42
 "You Must Follow" - 5:29
 "'Disco' La Passione" (Vocals: Shirley Bassey) - 4:57
 "Dov'è II Signore? Pt. 2" - 2:31 (Vocals: Toby Draper)
 "Le Mans" - 3:59

References

External links
 

British auto racing films
British drama films
Chris Rea albums
1996 soundtrack albums
Drama film soundtracks
East West Records soundtracks
1996 films
1990s British films